Nangli Poona is a small village on main G.T. - Karnal Road in North West Delhi. Near Jain mandir.

References 

Villages in North West Delhi district
Maratha Empire

Nangli Poona is a small village located in the Narela tehsil of the North West Delhi district of NCT of Delhi, India.[1]

Nangli Poona is en route to Panipat and on the GT Karnal Road in the west and Yamuna River in the east. Nangli is a Marathi word which means relocated/relocation, and the suffix Poona suggests connection to Poona, the capital of Maratha kingdom in the 18th century which is the same as the marathas of Pune belt(rane) . A cursory glance of the village shows a striking resemblance of Maratha architecture. The short structured build of the inhabitants, high cheekbones, deep eyes, dark complexion, and sharp nose points towards Maratha ancestry.

The traditions are as similar as the appearance of the people here. When someone sneezes, the blessings are in form of Jai ho chatrapati maharaj Ki. The turban is a replica of the Maratha turban, and the locals still carry the Bamboo stick, called the lathi, a carry forward from Maratha culture. The favorite sport is wrestling, as is with the Maratha community.

The folklore tells that some retreating Marathas from the 1761 debacle of 3rd battle of Panipat could move no further and decided to settle along the banks of Yamuna.

Nangli Poona, Khera kalan, Khera Khurd, Budpur Bijapur are not local names but have genesis in Marathi language. Hence Nangli Poona can trace its origin to Marathas of the 18th century.